Spirulina may refer to:

Biology
 Spirulina (dietary supplement), a cyanobacterium product and biomass that can be consumed by humans and other animals
 Arthrospira, a genus of cyanobacteria closely related to Spirulina
 Spirulina (genus), a genus of cyanobacterium
 Spirulina (suborder), a group of cephalopods
 Spirula, the only extant member of that suborder

See also
 Spiralinella, a genus of very small sea snails, pyramidellid gastropod mollusks, or micromollusks
Spirolina, is a genus of foraminifera in the family Peneroplidae

Taxonomy disambiguation pages